Dzi or DZI may refer to:

 Dzi bead
 DZI, a Bulgarian insurance company
 Deep Zoom Image, computer image file format